The 2008 Fordham Rams football team was an American football team that represented Fordham University during the 2008 NCAA Division I FCS football season. Fordham finished second-to-last in the Patriot League, a year after winning the league title. 

In their third year under head coach Tom Masella, the Rams compiled a 5–6 record. James Crockett, Fonzie Culver, Greg DeMarco, Matt Loucks, Richard Rayborn and John Skelton were the team captains.

The Rams were outscored 262 to 238; their 1–5 conference record placed sixth out of seven in the Patriot League standings. 

Fordham played its home games at Jack Coffey Field on the university's Rose Hill campus in The Bronx, in New York City.

An on-campus monument to the Seven Blocks of Granite was dedicated on October 24, honoring the offensive lines of 1929, 1930, 1936, and 1937. It is located on Constitution Row, near the west end of the grandstand of Coffey Field.

Schedule

References

Fordham
Fordham Rams football seasons
Fordham Rams football